Sphinx adumbrata is a moth of the  family Sphingidae. It is known from Mexico.

The thorax upperside, head upperside and palpi are grey. There is a narrow, black mesial line on the abdomen upperside with five elliptical, pale yellow spots. The abdomen underside is grey with a mesial black line. The forewing upperside is also grey, with a black basal patch on the hind margin and a black line in the discal cell. The hindwing upperside is grey with diffuse, dark, basal mesial and submarginal bands.

References

Sphinx (genus)
Moths described in 1912
Sphingidae of South America
Moths of South America